This is a list of shop signs in Boston, Massachusetts, in the 18th century.

A
 Sign of Admiral Vernon, King Street
 Sign of the Anchor
B
 Sign of the Barber's Poll, Long Wharf
 Sign of the Basket of Lemons, Middle St.
 Sign of the Bellows, Ann Street
 Sign of the Bible, Cornhill
 Bible and Crown, Dock Square
 Bible and Heart, Cornhill
 Sign of the Bible and Three Crowns, Ann St.
 Sign of the Black and White Horse 
 Sign of the Black Boy and But, Cornhill
 Sign of the Black Horse
 Sign of the Blue Ball, Union St.
 Sign of the Blue Boar
 Blue Dog, Wing's Lane
 Blue Dog & Rainbow, Cambridge St.
 Blue Glove, Union St.
 Sign of the Blue Horse, Cornhill
 Sign of the Boot, Marlborough Street
 Sign of the Boys and Bullock's Head, Water St.
 Sign of the Brazen Head, Cornhill
 Sign of the Breeches and Gloves, Ann St.
 Sign of the Buck, Marlborough St.
 Sign of the Buck and Glove, Cornhill
 Sign of the Bull
 Sign of the Bunch of Grapes, King St.
C
 Sign of the Case of Draws, North Street
 Sign of the Chest of Draws, "near the New North Meeting House"
 Sign of the Chest of Drawers, Middle Street
 Sign of the Chest of Drawers and Cabinet, Middle St.
 Sign of the Coat and Stay
 Sign of the Cock, Wing's Lane
 Sign of the Cornfields, Union St.
 Cromwell's Head, School Street
 Sign of the Crown
 Sign of the Crown and Comb, Queen St.
 Sign of the Crown and Cross, Fish Street
 Sign of the Crown and Razor
 Sign of the Crown and Sceptre, Back Street
 Sign of the Cross, Ann St.
 Sign of the Cross Guns, Fish St.
D
 Sign of the Dog and Pot, Ann St.
 Sign of the Dolphin, Fish St.
 Sign of the Drum, Back Street
 Sign of the Drum and Chairs
E
 Sign of the Eagle, Newbury Street
 Sign of the Elephant, King St.
 Sign of the Engine, Pond-Lane
F
 Faust's Statue, Newbury St.
 Five Sugar Loaves, Fish St.
 Sign of the Flower-Pot, Back St.
 Sign of the Four Sugar Loaves, Long Wharf
 Franklin's Head, Court St.

G
 Sign of General Warren, Wing's Lane
 Sign of the Goat, King St.
 Sign of the Golden Ball, Merchant's Row
 Sign of the Golden Cock
 Sign of the Golden Eagle, Dock Square
 Sign of the Golden Fleece, King St.
 Sign of the Golden Key, Ann St.
 Sign of the Good Samaritan
 Sign of the Grand Turk, Newbury St.
 Green Canister and Two Sugar Loaves, Marlborough St.
 Sign of the Green Dragon, Union St.
 Sign of the Green Wigg

H
 Sign of the Half Moon, Newbury St.
 Sign of the Hand and Beam, Middle St.
 Sign of the Hat, Cornhill
 Sign of the Hat & Hand, Cornhill
 Sign of the Hatt and Helmet
 Sign of the Hawk, Summer St.
 Sign of the Heart and Crown, Cornhill
 Sign of the Hoop Petticoat, "over against the north side of the Town House"

K
 Sign of the King's Arms

L
 Sign of the Lamb
 Sign of the Leopard, Ann St.
 Sign of the Leopard, Union St.
 Sign of the Light-House
 Sign of the Lion, Newbury St.
 Lion and Bell, Marlborough St.
 Sign of the Looking-Glass, Union St.
 Sign of the Lyon's Head and Crown, Fish St.
O
 Sign of the Orange Tree
P
 Sign of the Painter's Arms, Queen St.
 Sign of the Pine Tree and Two Sugar Loaves, King St.
 Sign of the Punch-Bowl, Dock Square
R
 Sign of the Rainbow & Dove, Marlborough St.
 Sign of the Red Cross
 Sign of the Red Cross & Crown
 Sign of the Red Horse
 Sign of the Red Lyon, Wood Lane
 Sign of the Roe-Buck, Fish Lane
 Rose and Crown, Union St.
 Sign of the Royal-Exchange, King St.
S
 Sign of the Salutation
 Sign of the Schooner, Fish St.
 Sign of the Ship, Long Wharf
 Sign of the Ship, Fish St.
 Sign of the Ship and Launch, King St.
 Sign of the Six Sugar Loaves, Union St.
 Sign of the Skales and Weights, "alley near Governours Dock"
 Sign of the Sloop, Anne Street
 Spectacles
 Sign of the Spring Clock & Watches, "near the draw-bridge in Anne Street"
 Sign of the Star, Hanover St.
 Sign of the Stationer's Arms
 Sign of the Stays
 Sign of the Sun, Draw-Bridge St.
 Sign of the Swan, Orange Street

T
 Sign of the Tea-Kettle, South-End
 Sign of the Thistle & Crown, Wing's Lane
 Sign of the Three Coaches, Quaker Lane
 Sign of the Three Doves
 Sign of the Three Golden Doves, Marlboro St.
 Sign of the Three Horse-Shoes
 Sign of the Three-Kings, Cornhill
 Sign of the Three Nuns, Cornhill
 Sign of the Three Nuns and Comb, Cornhill
 Sign of the Three Pine Trees, State St.
 Sign of the Three Shuttles, Long Lane
 Sign of the Three Sugar Loaves, King St.
 Sign of the Three Sugar Loaves and Canister, King St.
 Sign of the Two Boys and Ox's Head and Horns, Water St.
 Sign of the Two Sugar Loaves, Cornhill
 Two Sugar Loaves, Fleet St.
 Sign of the Tun and Bacchus, King St.
 Sign of the Turks Head
U
 Sign of the Unicorn, Cornhill
 Sign of the Unicorn and Mortar, Marlborough St.
W
 Sign of the Walnut Tree, Milk Street
 Sign of the Whale Fishery, Union St.
 Sign of the Wheat-Sheafe, Wing's Lane
 Sign of the White Horse
 Sign of the White Wigg, Fish St.

Y
 Sign of the Yankee Hero, Wing's Lane

References

Boston
Shop signs
Shop signs
Boston
Boston
Boston
Boston
Shop signs